India–Uzbekistan relations are the international relations that exist between the Republic of India and the Republic of Uzbekistan. India has an embassy in Tashkent; Uzbekistan has an embassy in New Delhi.

History
The 2 nations have has many historical ties, both of them being on the Silk Road. Babur, the founder of the Mughal Empire which ruled India from 1526–1857, was born in Andijan in present-day Uzbekistan.

India's first Prime Minister Jawaharlal Nehru visited Tashkent and Samarkand during his state visit to the Soviet Union in 7–23 June 1955. He visited Tashkent again during his state visit in 6–12 September 1961. Tashkent was the location of a historic meeting in January 1966 between Indian Prime Minister Lal Bahadur Shastri and Pakistani President Muhammad Ayub Khan. The Soviet Union, represented by Premier Alexei Kosygin served as moderators. The Tashkent conference, under United Nations, American and Soviet pressure, compelled India to give away the conquered region in Pakistan and the 1949 ceasefire line in Kashmir bringing an end to the Indo-Pakistani War of 1965. Prime Minister Shastri died in Tashkent, at 2 AM on the day after signing the Tashkent Declaration, reportedly due to a heart attack, but people allege conspiracy behind the death. He was the first Prime Minister of India to die overseas.

Uzbekistan declared its independence on 1 September 1991. The Consulate General of India in Tashkent had been opened on 7 April 1987. It was upgraded to an Embassy on 18 March 1992.

Timeline of State Visits:

 P. V. Narasimha Rao became the first Indian Prime Minister to visit Uzbekistan on 23–25 May 1993. 
 Prime Minister Manmohan Singh visited the country on 25–26 April 2006
 Uzbek President Islam Karimov has visited India several times; in 1991, 1994, 2000, 2005 and in May 2011. 
 Prime Minister Narendra Modi visited Uzbekistan in July 2015.
 Karimov's successor, Shavkat Mirziyoyev visited New Delhi in Autumn 2018 and January 2019.

Trade
Bilateral trade between India and Uzbekistan stood at US$235 million in 2017-18.

References

External links

 Embassy of India in Tashkent, Uzbekistan

 
Uzbekistan
Bilateral relations of Uzbekistan